Karthik Raja is an India composer based in Chennai, India. He made his debut as film composer in the Tamil film Pandiyan (1992) and went on to score music for many critically and commercially acclaimed feature films.

Personal life
Karthik Raja is the eldest son of music composer  Ilaiyaraaja. His brother Yuvan Shankar Raja and sister Bhavatharini, who are also Tamil film music directors and playback singers, have worked with him on notable projects. He did his schooling at St. Bede's School and Boston Matriculation higher secondary school in Chennai.  On 8 June 2000, Karthik Raja married Raja Rajeswari at Tirupati, Andhra Pradesh, India.

Career
Born to a family of musicians, he had exposure to various kinds of music at a very early age. He had his formal training in Western classical music from the Trinity School of Music, mainly in piano (affiliated with Jacob John). He also had training in Carnatic music from T. V. Gopalakrishnan and Malayalam composer V. Dakshinamoorthy.

As a child, he often used to accompany his father to the recording studios. At the age of 13, Karthik Raja played the keyboard for the song Kannukkum from the Tamil movie Ninaikka Therinda Maname (1987). Many such outings followed including playing keyboard for the soundtrack of the movie Nayakan. Karthik also arranged many recordings for his father and composed his first song "Pandianin Rajiyathil" for the movie Pandiyan (1992) and "Ninaikindra" for the movie Athma (1993). Around this time, he also composed some background scores for the TV series Bible.

He debuted as a full-fledged composer in 1996 through the Tamil movie Alexander, soon followed by Manikkam. Then came many chart-busters that included Ullaasam, Naam Iruvar Nammaku Iruvar, Kadhala Kadhala and Dumm Dumm Dumm among others. He also debuted in Hindi films with Grahan which won him the R.D. Burman award for the best new talent.

Discography

Film scores/Soundtracks

Singer

Albums

Awards
 1998: Filmfare RD Burman Award for New Music Talent – Grahan
 2001: Cinema Express Award for Best Music Director – Dumm Dumm Dumm

References

External links
 
 Official website
  Karthik Raaja Lounge

1970 births
Living people
People from Theni district
Tamil film score composers
Loyola College, Chennai alumni
20th-century classical composers
21st-century classical composers
Musicians from Tamil Nadu
Kannada film score composers
Telugu film score composers
Hindi film score composers
Filmfare Awards winners
20th-century Indian musicians